

Ashbrook Estate is an Australian winery based at Wilyabrup, in the Margaret River wine region of Western Australia.  The winery sells much of its output through the cellar door and to mailing list clientele.  Its wines, and especially its white wines, have been highly praised by influential Australian wine writers Ray Jordan and James Halliday.

See also

 List of wineries in Western Australia
 Western Australian wine

References

Notes

Bibliography

External links
 – official site

Food and drink companies established in 1975
Wilyabrup, Western Australia
Wineries in Western Australia
1975 establishments in Australia